Theodor Nöldeke (born 2 March 1836 – 25 December 1930) was a German orientalist and scholar.  His research interests ranged over Old Testament studies, Semitic languages and Arabic, Persian and Syriac literature. Nöldeke translated several important works of oriental literature and during his lifetime was considered an important orientalist. He wrote numerous studies (including on the Qur’ān) and contributed articles to the Encyclopædia Britannica.

Among the projects Nöldeke collaborated on was Michael Jan de Goeje’s published edition of al-Tabari's Tarikh ("Universal History"), for which he translated the Sassanid-era section. This translation remains of great value, particularly for the extensive supplementary commentary.
His numerous students included Charles Cutler Torrey, Louis Ginzberg and Friedrich Zacharias Schwally.  He entrusted Schwally with the continuation of his standard work "The History of the Qur’ān".

Biography
Nöldeke was born in Harburg, (Hamburg today). In 1853 he graduated  from the Gymnasium Georgianum Lingen, Emsland, and went on to study at the University of Göttingen under Heinrich Ewald, and later at the  University of Vienna, the University of Leiden and the Humboldt University of Berlin. In 1864 he became a professor at the University of Kiel and from 1872 at the University of Strasbourg until he retired aged 70.
Nöldeke had ten children, six of whom predeceased him. His son Arnold Nöldeke became a judge and was a Hamburg senator during the Weimar period. He died in Karlsruhe.

Distinctions
1859 – won the French Académie des Inscriptions et Belles-Lettres prize for his Histoire du Coran and Semitic languages, and the history and civilization of Islam.
1860 – Geschichte des Qorâns German edition published with additions at Göttingen.
1861 – lectures at the university of Göttingen.
1864 – extraordinary professor at the university of Göttingen.
1868 – ordinary professor at Kiel; Grammatik der neusyrischen Sprache published.
1872 – chair of Oriental Languages at Strassburg, (resigns in 1906).
1874 – Mandäische Grammatik published.
1878 – Foreign member of the Royal Netherlands Academy of Arts and Sciences
1879 – external member of the Bavarian Academy of Sciences.
1881–1882 – translates Tabari (Arabic – German).
1888 – member of the Order Pour le Mérite for Sciences and Arts.
1892 – awarded an honorary doctorate by the University of Edinburgh.
1893 – appointed external member of the Accademia Nazionale dei Lincei in Rome.
1920 – associate member of the Heidelberg Academy of Sciences.
1926 – awarded honorary membership of the Russian Academy of Sciences –he had been a corresponding member since 1885; Honorary citizen of the city of Harburg (now part of Hamburg).

Selected works 
Encyclopædia Britannica, several early essays and article on the Qur'an, with others, republished in the journal Oriental Sketches. 
 Geschichte des Qorâns (1860; Leipzig, Dieterich, 2nd rev. ed., 1909–38, pt. 1, pt.2, ; English translation by Wolfgang H. Behn: The History of the Qurʾān, Leiden: Brill 2013)
 Das Leben Mohammeds  ("Life of Muḥammad", German text; Hanover, Rümpler, 1863)
 Beiträge zur Kenntnis der Poesie der alten Araber. (Hanover, Carl Rümpler, 1864)
 Die alttestamentliche Literatur (1868)
 Untersuchungen zur Kritik des Alten Testaments (1869)
 
 
 Histoire Littéraire de L'ancien Testament; French (Paris, Sandoz et Fischbacher, 1873)
 Geschichte der Perser und Araber zur Zeit der Sasaniden. Aus der arabischen Chronik des Tabari übersetzt (1879)
 
 
 
 
 
 Review of Julius Wellhausen's Reste Arabischen Heidentums (1887) in ZDMG, Vol. 41 (1887), pp. 707–26.
 Aufsätze zur persischen Geschichte (Leipzig, 1887); articles on Persia.
 Sketches from Eastern History (London & Edinburgh, Adam And Charles Black, 1892)
 A Servile War in the East [The Zanj Slave Uprising in 9th Century Mesopotamia] (English transl., John Sutherland Black; appeared as Chap. 5 in Sketches from Eastern History; 1892)
 
 [https://archive.org/details/dli.granth.111084/page/n3/mode/2upDas Iranische Nationalepos] (Strassburg: Trübner, 1896).
 Zur Grammatik des klassischen Arabisch (1896)
 Fünf Mo'allaqat, übersetzt und erklärt (1899–1901)
 Articles in the Encyclopaedia Biblica (1903)
 Beiträge zur semitischen Sprachwissenschaft (1904)
 Kalila wa Dimna (Strassburg, Trübner, 1912)
 Israel und die Völker nach jüdischer Lehre co-authored by August Wünsche; ed., Joseph S Bloch; (Berlin, Wien, 1922)

He contributed frequently to the Zeitschrift der Deutschen Morgenländischen Gesellschaft, the Göttingische gelehrte Anzeigen and the Expositor.

Nöldeke Chronology 
The Nöldeke Chronology is a "canonical ordering" of the 114 suras of the Qur'an according to the sequence of revelation.  Intended to aid theological, literary, and historical scholarship of Qur'anic exegesis by enhancing structural coherence. The Nöldeke Chronology has been adopted for general guidance by some schools of current scholarship. The Egyptian Edition, crafted 1924, is an adaptation of Nöldeke's work.  Nöldeke considered the suras from the perspective of content and stylistic development and linguistic origination to rearrange them in historical sequence of revelation. According to his system Sura 21: “The Prophets,” – 21st of 114 suras in the Qur'an – is renumbered '65'. His chronology further divided the suras into two periods: The Meccan (in three phases), and the Medina.

The Nöldeke Chronology of the Qur'an: Four groups of the 114 Suras:
Group 1. First Meccan Period (48 Suras): Surahs 96; 74; 111; 106; 108; 104; 107; 102; 105; 92; 90; 94; 93; 97; 86; 91; 80; 68; 87; 95; 103; 85; 73; 101; 99; 82; 81; 53; 84; 100; 79; 77; 78; 88; 89; 75; 83; 69; 51; 52; 56; 70; 55; 112; 109; 113; 114; 1
Group 2. Second Meccan Period (21 Suras): 54; 37; 71; 76; 44; 50; 20; 26; 15; 19; 38; 36; 43; 72; 67; 23; 21; 25; 17; 27; 18
Group 3. Third Meccan Period (21 Suras): 32; 41; 45; 16; 30; 11; 14; 12; 40; 28; 39; 29; 31; 42; 10; 34; 35; 7; 46; 6; 13
Group 4. Medinan Period (24 Suras): 2; 98; 64; 62; 8; 47; 3; 61; 57; 4; 65; 59; 33; 63; 24; 58; 22; 48; 66; 60; 110; 49; 9; 5

References

Citations

Sources

External links 

 
 
 
 History of Sasanian's State
 

1836 births
1930 deaths
German orientalists
German biblical scholars
German male non-fiction writers
Grammarians from Germany
History of Quran scholars
Humboldt University of Berlin alumni
Leiden University alumni
Linguists from Germany
Old Testament scholars
People from Harburg, Hamburg
Syriacists
Translators of the Quran into German
University of Göttingen alumni
University of Vienna alumni
Members of the Royal Netherlands Academy of Arts and Sciences
Recipients of the Pour le Mérite (civil class)
Shahnameh Researchers
Scholars of Mandaeism
Translators from Mandaic
Grammarians of Aramaic
Members of the Göttingen Academy of Sciences and Humanities